Borshchyovskiye Peski is a rural locality (a selo) and the administrative center of Borshchyovo-Peskovskoye Rural Settlement, Ertilsky District, Voronezh Oblast, Russia. The population was 605 as of 2010. There are 8 streets.

Geography 
Borshchyovskiye Peski is located 31 km southwest of Ertil (the district's administrative centre) by road. Borshyovo is the nearest rural locality.

References 

Rural localities in Ertilsky District